Silver Apples of the Moon is the debut studio album by British band Laika. It was released through Too Pure in 1994.

The album's title is derived from American electronic music composer Morton Subotnick's 1967 album of the same name.

Critical reception

Writing on the 2015 reissue for Exclaim!, Daniel Sylvester called Silver Apples of the Moon a "seminal" experimental pop album and "a welcome addition to any adventurous indie rock fan's collection."

In 2015, Fact placed the album at number 16 on its list of "The 50 Best Trip-Hop Albums of All Time".

Track listing

Personnel
Credits adapted from liner notes.

Laika
 Margaret Fiedler – vocals, sampler, guitar, Moog synthesizer, melodica, marimba, vibraphone, engineering, mixing
 Guy Fixsen – vocals, sampler, guitar, Moog synthesizer, melodica, marimba, vibraphone, engineering, mixing
 John Frenett – bass guitar
 Lou Ciccotelli – drums, percussion
 Louise Elliot – flute, saxophone

Production
 Neil – assistance
 Tony – assistance
 Giles – assistance
 James SK Wān – analogue editing
 Colm O'Ciosoig – digital editing

Artwork and design
 Laika – sleeve

References

External links
 

1994 debut albums
Laika (band) albums
Too Pure albums